Indian Accent is a restaurant located at The Lodhi hotel in New Delhi, India. It was established in 2009 by Rohit Khattar. It has outputs in New York City and London.

Indian Accent ran at The Manor hotel for eight years, before moving to The Lodhi.

Chef 

The restaurant is known for its Indian fusion cuisines supervised by chef Manish Mehrotra, who also heads the restaurant's kitchen and describes his style as "inventive Indian cuisine." He was recently on Master Chef India 2015 as a guest chef among other television appearances. Mehrotra is also the head chef at Old World Hospitality's restaurant Oriental Octopus in New Delhi and Lavasa.

Menu 
The restaurant "showcases inventive Indian cuisine by complementing the flavors and traditions of India with global ingredients and techniques." It offers staple, traditional Indian dishes with a contemporary, "cosmopolitan twang," as described by The New York Times. Some of its most renowned dishes are the galangal-infused patarani macchi, potato sphere chaat and meetha aachar (sweet pickle), and spare ribs.

Cookbook 
The Indian Accent Restaurant Cookbook is available for purchase at the restaurant and is based on the menu designed by chef Manish Mehrotra. It showcases a culmination of "local produce", "home-style cooking", and "unusual ingredients from around the world." The cookbook's photographs are captured by Indian food photographer Rohit Chawla and was launched at the Jaipur Literature Festival in 2017.

Accolades 
The restaurant has won various accolades over the years. In 2015 and 2016, it was ranked among the world's 50 best restaurants. It was also ranked 9th in Asia's 50 Best Restaurants list in 2016 and 22nd in 2015.

In 2017, Indian Accent was ranked 30th in Asia and 78th in the world, still standing as the best restaurant in India according to The World's 50 Best Restaurants. It has also been rated as the number one restaurant in India by TripAdvisor for 2014, 2015, 2016, and 2017 consecutively.

References

Restaurants in Delhi